The defense of the Great Wall (January 1 – May 31, 1933) was a campaign between the armies of Republic of China and Empire of Japan, which took place before the Second Sino-Japanese War officially commenced in 1937 and after the Japanese invasion of Manchuria in 1931.

During this campaign, Japan successfully captured the Inner Mongolian province of Rehe from the Chinese warlord Zhang Xueliang, and incorporated it into the newly created state of Manchukuo, whose southern frontier was thus extended to the Great Wall of China.

Battle of Shanhai Pass
Shanhaiguan is the fortified eastern end of the Great Wall of China, where the Great Wall meets the ocean. Per the terms of the 1901 Boxer Rebellion accord, the Imperial Japanese Army maintained a small garrison of around 200 men at Shanhaiguan. On the night of 1 January 1933, the Japanese garrison commander staged an "incident" by exploding a few hand grenades and firing a few shots.  The Kwantung Army used this as an excuse to demand that the Chinese 626th Regiment of the Northeastern Army, guarding Shanhaiguan, evacuate the pass defenses.

When the Chinese garrison refused, the Japanese 8th Division issued an ultimatum, and then attacked the pass with the support of 4 armored trains and 10 tanks. The Japanese attack was supported by close air support from bombers, and by shelling by warships of the Imperial Japanese Navy's IJN 2nd Fleet with a dozen warships offshore. On January 3, Chinese regimental commander Shi Shian, unable to withstand this attack, was forced to evacuate from his positions after losing half of his force.

Battle of Rehe

The province of Rehe, on the northern side of the Great Wall, was the next target. Declaring the province to be historically a portion of Manchuria, the Japanese Army initially hoped to secure it through the defection of General Tang Yulin to the Manchukuo cause. When this failed, the military option was put into action. The Japanese army's Chief of Staff requested Emperor Hirohito's sanction for the 'strategic operation' against Chinese forces in Rehe. Hoping that it was the last of the army's operations in the area and that it would bring an end to the Manchurian matter, the Emperor approved, while stating explicitly that the army was not to go beyond the Great Wall. On February 23, 1933, the offensive was launched.  On February 25, Chaoyang and Kailu were taken. On March 2, the Japanese 4th Cavalry Brigade encountered resistance from the forces of Sun Dianying, and after days of fighting, took Chifeng.  On March 4, Japanese cavalry and the 1st Special Tank Company took Chengde the capital of Rehe.

Falling back from Rehe, Wan Fulin's 32nd Army retreated to Lengkou Pass, while the 29th Army of General Song Zheyuan also fell back, Zhang Zuoxiang's 37th Division retreated to Xifengkou Pass, General Guan Linzheng's 25th Division to the Gubeikou Pass.

On March 4, the 139th Division of the KMT 32nd Army managed to hold Lengkou Pass, and on March 7, the KMT 67th Army withstood attacks by the 16th Brigade of the Japanese 8th Division, at Gubeikou Pass.

On March 9, Chiang Kai-shek held discussions with Zhang Xueliang in Baoding about resisting the Japanese invasion.  Chiang Kai-shek began to relocate his forces away from his campaign against the Jiangxi Soviet, which would include the forces of Huang Jie, Xu Tingyao and Guan Linzheng. Chiang Kai-shek also called over Fu Zuoyi's 7th Army from Suiyuan.  However, his actions were too late and the reinforcements were of insufficient strength to stop the Japanese advance.

On March 11, Japanese troops pushed up to the Great Wall itself. On March 12, Zhang Xueliang resigned his post to He Yingqin who, as the new leader of the Northeastern Army, was assigned the duty of securing defensive positions along the Great Wall.

Over twenty close assaults were launched, with sword-armed Northwestern Army soldiers repelling them.  However, on March 21, the Japanese took Yiyuankou Pass. The KMT 29th Army evacuated from Xifengkou Pass on April 8.  On April 11, Japanese troops retook Lengkou Pass after dozens of seesaw fights over the pass defenses and Chinese forces at Jielingkou abandoned that pass.   The Chinese army was significantly underarmed in comparison to the Japanese and many units were equipped with predominantly with handguns, hand grenades, and traditional Chinese swords with limited supplies of trench mortars, heavy machine guns, light machine guns and rifles.  Beaten back by overwhelming Japanese firepower, on May 20, the Chinese army retreated from their remaining positions on the Great Wall.

Although the National Revolutionary Army (NRA) suffered defeat in the end, several individual NRA units like the He Zhuguo platoon managed to hold off the better equipped Japanese army for up to three days before being overrun. Some NRA Divisions also managed to win minor victories in passes like Xifengkou and Gubeikou by using the ramparts to move soldiers from one sector to another in the Great Wall, just like the Ming dynasty soldiers before them.

Aftermath

On May 22, 1933, Chinese and Japanese representatives met at Tanggu, Tianjin, to negotiate an end of the conflict. The resulting Tanggu Truce created a demilitarized zone extending one hundred kilometers south of the Great Wall, which the Chinese army was prohibited from entering, thus greatly reducing the territorial security of China proper, whereas the Japanese were permitted to use reconnaissance aircraft or ground units to make sure that the Chinese complied. Furthermore, the Chinese government was forced to acknowledge the de facto independence of Manchukuo and the loss of Rehe.

See also 

 Events preceding World War II in Asia
 Jinan incident (May 1928)
 Huanggutun incident (Japanese assassination of the Chinese head of state Generalissimo Zhang Zuolin on 4 June 1928)
 Japanese invasion of Manchuria
 Mukden Incident (18 September 1931)
 January 28 Incident (Shanghai, 1932)
 Marco Polo Bridge Incident (7 July 1937)
 List of military engagements of the Second Sino-Japanese War
 Order of battle Operation Jehol
 Order of battle Defense of the Great Wall
 Baimaguan Fort
 Suiyuan campaign
 Chahar People's Anti-Japanese Army

References

Citations

Sources

External links
 Battles of the Great Wall
The History of Battles of Imperial Japanese Tanks
Jehol 1933 Japanese photos from Operation Nekka.
"On Bended Knee". Time. January 23, 1933.
"Bumps & Blood". Time. February 27, 1933.
"War of Jehol". Time. March 6, 1933.
"Two-Gun Tang". Time. March 6, 1933.
"Glorious 16th". Time. March 13, 1933.

Topographic maps
Cheng-te nk50-11 SW Jehol Province, SE Chahar Province, NW Hebei Province (north of Beijing, Gubeikou Pass)
 Lin-yu nk50-12 S Jehol Province, NE Hebei Province, Great Wall to Shanhaikuan upper Luan River area
Ch'ang-Li nj50-4 NE Hebei Luan River area

Battles of the Second Sino-Japanese War
Conflicts in 1933
Great Wall of China
Military history of Manchuria
History of Inner Mongolia
1933 in China
1933 in Japan
Battles involving Manchukuo
History of Zhangjiakou